This article lists the results of the Morocco national football team from 1957 to 1989.

1950s

1957

1958

1959

1960s

1960

1961

1962

1963

1964

1965

1966

1967

1968

1969

1970s

1970

1971

1972

1973

1974

1975

1976

1977

1978

1979

1980s

1980

1981

1982

1983

1984

1985

1986

1987

1988

1989

Notes

References

Results